St Peter's School is a co-educational private boarding and day school (also referred to as a public school), in the English City of York, with extensive grounds on the banks of the River Ouse. Founded by St Paulinus of York in AD 627, it is considered to be the third oldest school in the world although some historians take a more sceptical view. It is part of the York Boarding Schools Group.

The school accepts pupils aged two to eighteen.

History

Founded in the English city of York by St Paulinus of York in the year AD 627, the school was originally based at York Minster. An early headmaster, Alcuin (Flaccus Albinus Alcuinus), went on to be Chancellor to the Emperor Charlemagne, and founded several of the earliest schools in mainland Europe. It is the third oldest school in the world. For most of its history, the school was a boys' school, but welcomed girls into the sixth form from 1976 before becoming fully coeducational in 1987.

Campus
The school grounds are located near the centre of York and stretch to the banks of the River Ouse. The main front of the school faces along Bootham; this is the oldest part of the site and comprises the Memorial Hall, Alcuin Library and Chapel, as well as dining facilities. Temple House and School House, the Department of Politics, the Department of Business, the Department of Economics, and the Department of Latin and Classics are also based in these buildings, accessed from an area known to the school community as the 'monkey cage'. Behind here is the Pascal building (Maths), Old Science Building (Chemistry), New Science Building (Physics, IT, and DT), Shepherd Rooms (Languages), The Grove and Clifton House. The Music School, the Dame Judi Dench Drama Centre, Hope House, and Queen's Building (History, Religious Studies, and English) are also located along the top of the Campus.

Boarding Houses Wentworth and Rise border the main campus, while Linton, Dronfield and The Manor are located across the road from the main school front accessible by footbridge. In the 2000s the school expanded its site under Headmaster Andrew Trotman to include the new lower campus, formally the site of Queen Anne's, a state school that had been recently closed. The move was not without its challenges, including the distance between the old and new sites and the dissection of a public footpath.

St Peter's 2–8

St Peter's 2–8 (formerly Clifton Pre-preparatory School) is the pre-prep school to St Peter's School, York. St Peter's 2–8 is located on the Upper Campus of the school, next door to the senior school which runs along the main road of Bootham in the centre of York. The current Head of St Peter's 2–8 is Phil Hardy.

In February 2018, Clifton School and Nursery was named as the best pre-prep/prep school in the annual TES Independent School Awards.

In summer 2020 Clifton Pre-Preparatory School and Nursery was renamed St Peter's 2–8 and, in April 2021, St Peter's 2–8 was named the best pre-prep school and independent school of the year in the annual TES Independent School Awards.

St Peter's 8–13

St Peter's 8–13 (formerly St Olave's School) is the junior school to St Peter's, with grounds on the banks of the River Ouse. The current Head of St Peter's 8–13 is Andy Falconer.

St Olave's was founded by Reverend Henry Andrew Wilson in 1876 and named after its original site of St Olave’s House in Marygate. The school was acquired by St Peter's School in 1901 and St Olave's was renamed St Peter's 8–13 in 2020.

In September 2001, St Olave's moved from the White House (the Chilman Building), and its half of the Queen's Building, to the newly acquired Queen Anne site. The pre-prep, St Peter's 2–8 (formerly Clifton Prep) moved from its original 19th-century building on The Avenue to occupy the buildings previously used by St Olave's.

St Peter's 8–13 is now located on the Lower Campus of the St Peter's School, which is also home to the senior school Biology and Art Departments.

Controversies

Complaints:
In 2006, St Peter's School closed a public footpath running through the school grounds using The Countryside and Rights of Way Act 2000. This was hotly disputed by local people.

Expulsions:
In 2014, four students were expelled, two for use of illegal drugs and two for inappropriate use of social media. A significant amount of parental dissatisfaction was reported due to poor communication about these matters. North Yorkshire Police noted that no report had been made to them with regards to the drugs offences.

Initiation Rituals:
In 2018 a former pupil reported in The Times that boys were subjected to humiliating and painful initiation rituals such as being shot with BB guns, hit in their genitalia with pool cues, and locked in closed spaces for hours at a time. The same pupil also reported being waterboarded with Listerine. Alistair Dunn, the school's acting headmaster, said in response that "St Peter's is a caring and nurturing school and initiation rites are unacceptable."

Residential Development:
In 2022, St Peter's submitted an application to develop land in the green belt of York, behind the school. The plan would turn green fields on the flood plan into artificial sports fields and a large car and coach park. The plan would also turn a neighbouring narrow cul-de-sac into a busy through road for coaches and cars, with over 100 local residents submitting complaints to the council with regards to this development. Local residents have reported health and safety concerns for their families, as well as the loss of grass verges and protected ancient trees on the road. York Central MP Rachael Maskell and local councillors have expressed alarm over the impending redesignation of this land as educational facilities, removing the green belt protection. They noted that the site was already in a flood level 3 area and that as recently as 2015, local houses next door to St Peter's were flooded.

Whimsy
In March 2022, the York Press reported that Headteacher Jeremy Walker rolled up his sleeves one Saturday to serve meals in the school canteen, due to a high level of COVID-19 related staff absences. Jeremy commented, "I was delighted to respond to the call for help this weekend and I am happy to report to duty whenever required".

Academic
The school has a history of high academic achievement across all age ranges.

Language-learning is also encouraged from a young age. Latin is compulsory for the first four years of study and also offered at GCSE and A Level. Religious Studies is a compulsory GCSE subject.

Sport
A wide range of activities are available at the school: these include rugby, football, hockey, netball, tennis, cricket, rowing, athletics, basketball, badminton, cross-country, climbing, squash, swimming, weight training, trampolining, water polo and aerobics. The school has sporting fields, gymnasiums, an indoor swimming pool, two multi-sport indoor centres, tennis courts, multi-use astroturf pitches, a rifle range, and a boathouse.

For 27 years, cricket was coached by Keith Mohan. In 2002 the school's U15 rugby team won the national Daily Mail Cup competition and the U18 team were narrowly beaten in 2005 in the final against Exeter College, Exeter . In 2011 the U16 team won the UCLAN Northern Schools Floodlit Competition.

St Peter's School Boat Club was founded in the 1850s and is one of the oldest school rowing clubs in the world. It has had success at international level with over 28 GB 'vests' earned by Peterites since 1998. On the domestic scene it has won nine medals at The National Schools' Regatta, 12 medals at The National Championships, and 25 appearances at Henley (both Men's and Women's), all since 1991.

Music
The School Choir averages over 150 members a year, but there is also a more selective Chapel Choir as well as an elite Chamber Choir. Highlights of the choral calendar include the Carol Service at York Minster, as well as visits to the Minster and further afield to sing Evensong.

The school has Barbershop Quartets, a Brass Group, Chamber Groups, a Choral Society, a Close Harmony Group, String Orchestras, String Quartets, Swing Band/Traditional Jazz, a Symphony Orchestra, Senior Wind Band, Woodwind, Quintets and Quartets.

Headmasters

 Paulinus 627
 James, The Deacon 630–660
 Wilfrid I 668
 Bosa 691
 John of Beverley 705
 Wilfrid II 718
 Egbert 732
 Albert 766
 Alcuin 778–782
 Laurentius Sirius 1094
 Robert 1120
 Murdach 1130
 Gwydo 1140
 Walter de Nessam 1266
 Alexander of York 1350
 John of York 1368
 Walter Heriez 1397
 John de Rishton 1400
 John Brockholes 1410
 John Saxton 1426
 John Marshall 1426
 W Marshall 1426
 Gilbert Pinchbeck 1426
 Master Gilbert 1453
 Roger Lewsay 1457
 John Hamundson 1465
 John Gylliott 1484
 James Sheffield 1486
 Christopher Holdsworth 1531
 Master Amler 1535 (Royal Charter)
 Rev. John Fletcher 1565
 Rev. William James 1575
 Rev. John Pulleyn 1576
 Rev. John Bayles 1590
 Rev. Canon William Thomas 1595
 Rev. John Johnson 1614
 Rev. Christopher Wallis 1638
 Rev. W illiam Langley 1660
 William Thomlinson 1679
 Rev. W Herbert 1711
 Rev. Zachariah Blake 1726
 Rev. John Blake 1757
 Rev. John Robinson 1784
 Rev. Isaac Grayson 1793
 Rev. Stephen Creyke 1827
 Rev. William Hewson 1838
 Rev. Archdeacon William Hey 1844
 Rev. Richard Elwyn 1864
 Rev. Henry M Stephenson 1872
 Rev. George T Handford 1887
 Rev. Edward C Owen 1900
 Samuel M Toyne 1913
 Aubrey J Price 1936
 John Dronfield 1937
 Peter D R Gardiner 1967
 Peter Hughes 1980
 David Cummin 1984
 Robin Pittman 1985
 Andrew Trotman 1995
 Richard Smyth 2004
 Leo Winkley 2010
 Jeremy Walker 2019

Houses
The school has ten day- and boarding houses, and each house has its own colour. Dronfield (pink) and Rise (white) are girls' boarding houses; Linton (baby blue) and The Manor (gold) are boys' boarding houses. The rest are day houses: Clifton (yellow), The Grove (red), Queens (purple), Temple (green), School (maroon), and Hope (orange). The house system is a long-standing tradition throughout the school's history. As the houses are physical, located in various buildings and parts of buildings throughout the school campus, a sense of community is developed, bringing pupils of all ages together to compete in inter-house competitions, like rugby.  "House Colours" are an award that is given in the form of a tie (formerly a badge for female students as they did not wear ties when they were first admitted) to pupils for an outstanding contribution to house activities.

In 1982 there were only seven houses: the boarding houses were: School, Rise, Dronfield, and The Manor; the day houses were: Queens, Grove, and Temple. Hope, Clifton, and Linton are of more recent origin. Houses were mixed and female boarders had their own quarters.

Boarding
St Peter's has received an overall quality rating of 'Outstanding' in their 2007 Ofsted Boarding Inspection.

Religion

The school has a Chapel with compulsory services 3 mornings a week. Eucharist is also held once a term and there are special services to mark Festivals in the Christian calendar. A service is held on Remembrance Sunday during which all pupils place poppies on the book of remembrance in the Ante-chapel (which contains names of alumni killed in conflict). The school's Christmas Carol Service is held in York Minster.

Religious education is compulsory at the school until Sixth Form, and is taught by both academic staff and the school's two Church of England clergy.

York Minster
York Minster has a long connection with St Peter's, as the school's founder was an Archbishop of York. This relationship is also evident in the school's name, which mirrors the formal title of the Minster, The Cathedral and Metropolitical Church of St Peter. At its foundation, the school was probably housed next to the earliest cathedral building.

At the end of each academic year a Commemoration and Prizegiving service is held in the Minster and a Carol Service is also held there at Christmas. The school choir often sings in the Minster and in the 2006/2007 year they participated in Verdi's Requiem, which brought together the wider York community.

St Peter’s School is now the home of York Minster’s Choristers, after the closure of the Minster School in Summer 2020.

Traditions
Morning Prayers – all members of the school attend a chapel service,
Eucharist – a whole school Eucharist service takes place each term and at other significant Christian festivals.
Uniform – the school has a brown uniform featuring the "cross keys" of St Peter for all pupils (except members of the Sixth Form). The old woollen blazer was later replaced with a more modern cotton jacket. Other changes to the uniform have also taken place, including the removal of ties for female pupils, who now wear an open blouse. In Sixth Form, dark suits must be worn.
Gowns – the school has a tradition of gowns which reflect pupils' authority or commitments. These are worn during public events such as services at York Minster and during school events (including Chapel and Assembly). The Head Boy and Head Girl wear brown, followed by the Head Master's Prefects who wear navy. These are issued during the 'gowning' at First Assembly each academic year. Members of the Chapel Committee and choirs wear red gowns, which are fuller depending upon level (Chamber Choir; Chapel Choir; School Choir). School masters also wear collegiate gowns for services and public events.
Capping – is the practice of reward for exceptional sporting achievement and is awarded at the end of the relevant sports season.
5 November – on Guy Fawkes Night, the school does not partake in the common tradition of burning a 'Guy' on the bonfire, as Guy Fawkes was an Old Peterite (alumnus). There is, however, a long tradition of putting on a firework display for the Boarders.
Fagging – the tradition of younger pupils serving older pupils was abolished in 1977.

Notable alumni

Current members of the school are known as 'Peterites' (and 'Olavites' for St Olave's Junior School) with alumni referred to as "Old Peterites", or OPs for short. Notable OPs include:

Sport:
Andrew Springgay – professional rugby player for Aviron Bayonnais, SU Agen and England A
Helen Austin – British rower
Jonny Bairstow – first class cricketer for Yorkshire and England
Sam Bond – professional bodybuilder and TV personality on Gladiators
Oli Denton – professional rugby union player for Leeds Carnegie/Leeds Tykes
Tom Denton – professional rugby union player for Leeds Carnegie
Frank Mitchell – first class cricketer for Yorkshire
James Thompson (racing driver) – auto racing driver and commentator for Eurosport's World Touring Car Championship coverage
Peter Wackett – professional rugby union player for Leeds Tykes
Norman Yardley – English cricketer

Academics and historians:
Alcuin (Flaccus Albinus Alcuinus), former Head Master, went on to be Chancellor to the Emperor Charlemagne.
Frederick Henry Marvell Blaydes – renowned classical scholar

Angus M. Bowie, classical scholar
Henry Dodwell – an Anglo-Irish writer, scholar, theologian and controversialist
William Fishburn Donkin – Professor of Astronomy, University College, Oxford
Christopher Hill – English Marxist historian and textbook author
C. Northcote Parkinson – naval historian and author of some sixty books, the most famous of which was his bestseller Parkinson's Law
Francis W. Pixley – accountant, barrister and author; was Deputy Lieutenant for Buckinghamshire

Artists and media figures:
John Barry – composer, best known for composing 11 James Bond soundtracks
Katherine Downes – television presenter, specialising in sports coverage
Laurence Eusden – became Poet Laureate in 1718
Harry Gration – broadcaster with the BBC
Rob Heaps – English actor
Justin Hill – English novelist
Fleur Keith – English actress
Basil Radford – film actor
Mark Simpson – journalist, writer, and broadcaster specialising in pop culture, media, and masculinity credited with coining the word metrosexual
Jimmy Thompson – actor, writer, and director
Greg Wise – English actor

Political figures:
Neil Carmichael – Conservative Member of Parliament for Stroud
James Clappison – British politician and barrister. He is the Conservative Member of Parliament for Hertsmere.
John Healey – British Labour politician
Alan Mak – Conservative Member of Parliament for Havant
Sir John Rodgers, 1st Baronet – British Conservative politician
Frank Swettenham – British colonial official

Religious figures:
George Forrest Browne – clergyman, became Bishop of Bristol
Maurice Harland – 20th century Bishop of Durham
Robert William Bilton Hornby – an antiquarian, priest, and Lord of the Manor of Heworth York
Henry Herbert Williams – Bishop of Carlisle

Judges:
John Mortimer – Judge of the Hong Kong Court of Final Appeal and President of the Court of Appeal of Brunei Darussalam

Armed forces:
Frank Bingham – army officer who died in World War I
Walbanke Ashby Pritt – British World War I flying ace credited with five aerial victories. He flew with the Royal Flying Corps in 1917/1918; flying Sopwith Pups.

Business leaders:
Gordon Gibb – prominent businessman, owner of theme park Flamingo Land Resort and former director of Bradford City Football Club
Frank Pick – manager in transport sector including Underground Group and London Passenger Transport Board
Joseph Terry – confectioner who presided over Joseph Terry & Sons Ltd.

Historical figures:
Guy Fawkes – conspirator of the Gunpowder Plot
John Wright – conspirator in the Gunpowder Plot

See also
The Minster School, York
List of the oldest schools in the world

References

Secondary sources

External links
St Peter's website
St Olave's website
Clifton Pre-prep website
Old Peterite Club
Boat Club website
Profile on the ISC website

Private schools in York
Educational institutions established in the 7th century
 
Member schools of the Headmasters' and Headmistresses' Conference
Boarding schools in North Yorkshire
7th-century establishments in England
Church of England private schools in the Diocese of York
Buildings and structures completed in 627